The Diocese of New York and New Jersey is a diocese of the Orthodox Church in America covering the states of New York and New Jersey. The Cathedral of the Protection of the Holy Virgin on Second Street in Manhattan is the seat of the bishop, with diocesan offices located in Syosset, New York. The diocese is headed by Archbishop Michael Dahulich, the diocesan bishop, who assumed control of the diocese after his consecration to the episcopacy on May 8, 2010.

History

The formal establishment of the Diocese of New York and New Jersey occurred after the OCA was granted autocephaly in 1970. As the diocese was the see of the ruling hierarch of the mission, and later of the autocephalous church, it supported the national Church's administration. The administrative offices were located, first, in New York City at the Holy Protection Cathedral and later, since about 1967, in Oyster Bay Cove, New York. 

Upon the establishment of the Diocese of Washington in 1981, the metropolitan and primatal see transferred to the new diocese, leaving New York as a local diocese. 

It was merged with the Diocese of Washington in 2005 as the Diocese of Washington and New York. It was restored as a separate diocese in 2009, with Metropolitan Jonah, who remained bishop of the Washington diocese, as Locum tenens. 

After the reinstatement of the diocese, meetings were held to prepare for the election of a new hierarch.  Eventually, Fr. Michael Dahulich was chosen, who was then consecrated the following spring and who remains the current bishop of the diocese.

The oldest church in use is the Sts. Peter and Paul Orthodox Church located at Buffalo, New York.

References

External links
 

New York
Eastern Orthodoxy in New Jersey
Eastern Orthodoxy in New York (state)
Christian organizations established in 1970
Eastern Orthodox organizations established in the 20th century
Dioceses established in the 20th century